Bongani Michael Mkongi (born 9 March 1971) was the Deputy Minister of Police in South Africa from March 2017 to May 2019.

Education and Career 
The Deputy Minister in 1998 studied towards an Honours Degree in Economics with the University of the Western Cape (UWC), but could not complete due to his overseas travelling doing the international work of the ANCYL. However he managed to complete three modules: International Economics, Development Economics and Micro-Economics.

Mr Mkongi carries with him a National Higher Diploma in Education Commerce and BTECH Commercial Education. He has now accepted to study towards Post Graduate Diploma in Economic Policy.

See also

African Commission on Human and Peoples' Rights
Constitution of South Africa
History of the African National Congress
Politics in South Africa
Provincial governments of South Africa

References

Living people
1971 births
21st-century South African politicians